Cackleberry may refer to:

 a chicken's egg
Cackleberry Airport, Dexter, Michigan, United States